Gregg Henriques is an American psychologist. He is a professor for the Combined-Integrated Doctoral Program, at James Madison University, in Harrisonburg, Virginia, US.

He developed the Unified Theory Of Knowledge (UTOK), which consists of eight key ideas that Henriques claims results in a much more unified vision of science, psychology and philosophy.

Dr. Henriques has specific research interests in social motivation and affect, beliefs and values, integrative psychotherapy, depression and suicide, the nature of mental disorders, and the relationship between psychiatry and professional psychology. For his education, he received his master's degree in Clinical/Community Psychology from the University of North Carolina at Charlotte, and his Ph.D. in Clinical Psychology from the University of Vermont. He also worked two years as a Research Assistant Professor at the University of Pennsylvania, where his primary role was director of a randomized controlled clinical trial exploring the effectiveness of psychotherapy for recent suicide attempters.

Unified Theory Of Knowledge

Henriques' Unified Theory Of Knowledge contains eight ideas.

The first key idea and most central is called the Tree of Knowledge (ToK) System, which provides a new map of cosmic evolution and the way science functions as a justification system that empirically maps behavioral complexity and change. Central to the argument for the ToK System is what Henriques calls, "the problem of psychology" which refers to the fact that the field of psychology has resided in a pre-paradigmatic state and lacked a clear definition and subject matter since it was founded in the later part of the 19th Century.

Henriques first published the outline of his work in 2003 in Review of General Psychology in the paper, The Tree of Knowledge System and the theoretical unification of psychology. Two special issues of the Journal of Clinical Psychology in 2004 and 2005 were devoted to the elaboration and evaluation of the model, as was a special section in Theory and Psychology in 2008. In 2011, he published A New Unified Theory of Psychology and later that year he started his popular blog on Psychology Today called Theory of Knowledge: A Unified Approach to Psychology and Philosophy.

The second key idea is Justification Systems Theory, which provides a new theory of the evolution of language, self-consciousness and culture and the defining forces that transformed humans from primates into also being cultured persons. The third key idea is Behavioral Investment Theory, which is a metatheoretical framework that integrates the animal mind, brain, and behavior sciences. The fourth key idea is the Influence Matrix, which maps the intrapsychic and interpersonal elements of human social motivation, emotion and relational exchange. Together, these four ideas make up the Unified Theory of Psychology.

The fifth key idea is Character Adaptation Systems Theory, which provides a "new big five" model of character adaptation systems (i.e., habitual, experiential, relational, defensive and justification systems) that links personality theory with the major approaches to individual psychotherapy. The Wheel of Development is the sixth key idea and it identifies the primary domains of personality that emerge in the course of human development (i.e., traits, identity, values/virtues, abilities and talents, and challenges and pathologies). The Nested Model of Well-being is the seventh key idea and it maps the four domains that constitute human well-being. Finally, the eighth key idea is CALM-MO, which is an integrative approach to psychological mindfulness that ties together the key principles and processes for healthy, reflective models of socio-emotional functioning. These latter four ideas constitute what the Unified Approach to psychotherapy.

Henriques argues these ideas fill in key missing pieces of the puzzle that are apparent in the problem of psychology. By filling these puzzle pieces in, a new, much more coherent picture of knowledge emerges, thus the overall frame being referred to as the Unified Theory Of Knowledge. To advance this vision, Henriques has founded the Theory Of Knowledge Society, which brings academics, independent scholars, therapists and lay persons together to reflect on the large challenges modern society faces and what big picture systems like the UTOK offer.

Publications

Books 
Henriques, G. R. (2022). A new synthesis for solving the problem of psychology: Addressing the Enlightenment Gap. Palgrave-Macmillan.

Henriques, G. R. (2011). A new unified theory of psychology. New York: Springer.

Papers
 Henriques, G. R., Michalski, J., Quackenbush, S, & Schmidt, W. (2019). The Tree of Knowledge System: A new map of Big History. Journal of Big History 3(4), 1–18.
 Henriques, G. R. & Michalski, J. (2019). Defining behavior and its relationship to the science of psychology. Integrative Psychological and Behavioral Science 54(1), 1-26. https://doi.org/10.1007/s12124-019-09504-4
 Henriques, G. R. (2019). Toward a metaphysical empirical psychology. Book chapter (pp. 209–237) in Re-envisioning theoretical and philosophical psychology (Ed. Thomas Teo).  
 Henriques, G. R. & Panizo, M. (2018). The behavioral shutdown model: A consilient biopsychosocial view of depression. Book chapter in J. Michalski (Ed), Sociological Theory, Methods, and Perspectives.
 Henriques, G. R. (2017). Achieving a unified clinical science requires a meta-theoretical solution: A comment on Melchert (2016). American Psychologist, 72, 393–394.
 Henriques, G. R. (2017). Character adaptation systems theory: A new big five for personality and psychotherapy. Review of General Psychology, 21, 9-22. 
 Henriques, G. R. (2016). Teaching clinical decision-making. Book chapter in J. Magnavita (Ed). Clinical Decision-Making in Behavioral and Mental Health Practice (pp. 273–307). Washington D.C.: American Psychological Association.  
 Henriques, G. R., Kleinman, K., & Asselin, C. (2014). The Nested Model of well-being: A unified approach. Review of General Psychology, 18, 7–18, .
 Henriques, G. R. (2013). Evolving from methodological to conceptual unification. Review of General Psychology, 17, 168–173.. 
 Henriques, G. R. (2008). The problem of psychology and the integration of human knowledge: Contrasting Wilson's Consilience with the Tree of Knowledge System. Theory and Psychology, 18, 731–755.
 Henriques, G. R. (2005). A new vision for the field: Introduction to the second special issue on the unified theory. Journal of Clinical Psychology, 61, 3–6. Full text
 Henriques, G. R. (2005). Toward a useful mass movement. Journal of Clinical Psychology, 61, 121–139. Full text
Henriques, G. R (2004) "Psychology Defined". Journal of Clinical Psychology, 60/12, pp. 1207–21. Full text
 Henriques, G. R. (2004). The development of the unified theory and the future of psychotherapy. Psychotherapy Bulletin, 39, 16–21. Full text
 Henriques, G. R., & Cobb, H.C. (2004). Introduction to the special issues on the unified theory. Journal of Clinical Psychology, 60, 1203–1205. Full text
 Henriques, G. R., & Sternberg, R. J. (2004). Unified professional psychology: Implications for combined-integrated doctoral training programs. Journal of Clinical Psychology, 60, 1051–1063. Full text
 Henriques, G. R., Brown G.K., Berk M.S., & Beck A.T. (2004). Marked increases in psychopathology found in a 30-year cohort comparison of suicide attempters. Psychological Medicine, 34, 833–841. Full text
 Henriques, G. R.(2003) "The Tree of Knowledge System and the Theoretical Unification of Psychology".  Review of General Psychology, Vol. 7, No. 2, 150–182. Fulltext.
 Henriques, G. R. (2003). But where does biology meet psychology? Theory and Psychology, 13, 715–716.
 Henriques, G. R. (2002). The harmful dysfunction analysis and the differentiation between mental disorder and disease. Scientific Review of Mental Health Practice, 1 (2), 157–173. Full text
 Henriques, G. R. (2000). Depression: Disease or behavioral shutdown mechanism? Journal of Science and Health Policy, 1, 152–165. Full text

External links
 gregghenriques.com
 Unified Theory of Knowledge official website

21st-century American psychologists
James Madison University faculty
Living people
Year of birth missing (living people)